Nazareth House, also known as St. Andrew's Parish House, is a historic building in Rochester, Monroe County, New York, United States. It is a three-story, brick institutional building built in 1893 and enlarged in 1911.  The original section is a three-story, five bay, red brick structure in the Neoclassical style.  The building was once used for social and education services, but was renovated in the early 1980s into six apartments.

It was listed on the National Register of Historic Places in 1984.  It is located in the South Wedge Historic District.

References

Properties of religious function on the National Register of Historic Places in New York (state)
Neoclassical architecture in New York (state)
Houses completed in 1893
Houses in Rochester, New York
National Register of Historic Places in Rochester, New York
Historic district contributing properties in New York (state)